Dundowran is a rural locality in the Fraser Coast Region, Queensland, Australia.

Geography 
Dundowran has mixed land use, including residential, industrial and agricultural (dry and irrigated crops and grazing on native vegetation). There are also two quarries.

History 
The name Dundowran might be derived from the Kabi language "thundarun" indicating plum tree, a reference to either the Burdekin plum (Pleiogynuim timorense) or the Davidsons plum (Davidsonia pruriens). However, it might also be named for the Queensland kauri pine (Agathis robusta).

Dundowran Provisional School opened on 28 September 1891, becoming Dundowran State School on 1 January 1909. It closed in December 1960. The school was initially located on the "Red Road" (the sloping road from the Dundowran Hall to Nikenbah) but was later moved a mile away to a location near the entrance of the quarry.

Heritage listings 
Dundowran has a number of heritage-listed sites, including:
 166 Craignish Road: Gallagher and Bagnell grave site 
 407 Lower Mountain Road: Dundowran Recreational Hall

Education 
There are no schools in Dundowran. The nearest primary school is Yarrilee State School in Uraween to the east and Hervey Bay State High School in Pialba to the north-east.

References

Further reading 
 

Fraser Coast Region
Localities in Queensland